Freddy Schwienbacher (born 3 August 1975) is an Italian cross-country skier. He competed at the 2002 Winter Olympics and the 2006 Winter Olympics.

Cross-country skiing results
All results are sourced from the International Ski Federation (FIS).

Olympic Games

World Championships

World Cup

Season standings

Individual podiums
1 victory – (1 )
2 podiums – (2 )

Team podiums
 1 victory – (1 ) 
 4 podiums – (2 , 2 )

References

External links
 

1975 births
Living people
Italian male cross-country skiers
Olympic cross-country skiers of Italy
Cross-country skiers at the 2002 Winter Olympics
Cross-country skiers at the 2006 Winter Olympics
Sportspeople from Merano